Earnest L. Gray (born March 2, 1957) is a former American football wide receiver in the National Football League (NFL) who played for the New York Giants and St. Louis Cardinals.  He played college football at the University of Memphis and was drafted by the Giants in the second round of the 1979 NFL Draft.  He caught 78 passes for 1,139 yards and five touchdowns in 1983.

He played on a Giants team that in 1981 made the playoffs after a 18-year hiatus. He finished his career with 246 receptions for 3,790 yards and 27 touchdowns.

References

1957 births
Living people
People from Greenwood, Mississippi
Players of American football from Mississippi
American football wide receivers
Memphis Tigers football players
New York Giants players
St. Louis Cardinals (football) players